Still on Top – The Greatest Hits is the third compilation album to be issued by Northern Irish singer-songwriter Van Morrison in 2007. It was released
22 October 2007 in the UK in a two-CD album with 37 tracks and with a three-CD Digipak limited edition box set also available on initial release of the album in the UK. On 29 October 2007 it was listed at No. 2 on the UK Official Top 75 Albums, his highest charting ever. The album also charted at No. 3 on the Top 75 Albums in Ireland, his highest debut in that country. In its second week of release it topped the Swedish albums chart, and has since been certified gold.

It was released on 6 November 2007, in the U.S. and Canada on a single disc with 21 tracks and is also available as an MP3 download. The single disc album charted at No. 48 on the U.S. Billboard 200 and No. 37 in Canada on the Soundscan charts.

The tracks consist of Morrison's biggest hits from 1964 as leader of the Northern Irish band Them through his 2005 release Magic Time. It contains no tracks from Astral Weeks.

Track listing
All songs written by Van Morrison except as noted and were remastered (with the symbol *) unless unspecified.

Charts

Weekly charts

Year-end charts

Certifications

Notes

2007 greatest hits albums
Albums produced by Van Morrison
Van Morrison compilation albums